is a city in Kumamoto Prefecture, Japan. The city was founded on April 1, 1954.

On January 15, 2005, Yamaga absorbed the towns of Kahoku, Kamoto, Kaō and Kikuka (all from Kamoto District) to create the new and expanded city of Yamaga.

As of March 31, 2017, the city has a population of 53,404 and a population density of 180 persons per km2. The total area is 299.67 km2.

Geography

Surrounding municipalities 
 Kumamoto Prefecture
 Gyokutō
 Kikuchi
 Kumamoto
 Nagomi
 Fukuoka Prefecture
 Yame
 Ōita Prefecture
 Hita

Climate
Yamaga has a humid subtropical climate (Köppen climate classification Cfa) with hot, humid summers and cool winters. There is significant precipitation throughout the year, especially during June and July.

Demography 
According to Japanese census data, this is the population of Yamaga in recent years.

Local attractions
Attractions include the Kumamoto Prefectural Ancient Burial Mound Museum.
Yamaga Bon-dancing Lantern Festival, every August event
Yachio-za Traditional Teather

Notable people
 Kiyoura Keigo, politician
 Raizō Matsuno, politician
 Yorihisa Matsuno, politician
 Ikuo Kabashima, politician
 Shin'ichi Etō, baseball player
 Kōhei Miyazaki, football player
 Sō Kawahara, football player
 Chiyohakuhō Daiki, sumo wrestler
 Daiki Inaba, professional wrestler
 Mayumi Aoki, swimmer
 Ryōtarō Araki, football player

References

External links

  

Cities in Kumamoto Prefecture